Ixora st-johnii is a species of flowering plant in the family Rubiaceae. It is endemic to the island Huahine in French Polynesia.

References

External links
World Checklist of Rubiaceae

stjohnii
Flora of French Polynesia
Data deficient plants
Taxonomy articles created by Polbot
Taxobox binomials not recognized by IUCN